Elisabeth Maria Silva de Faria known professionally as Betty Faria (born May 8, 1941 in Rio de Janeiro) is a Brazilian actress.

She is best known for her interpretation of the title character in the 1989 telenovela Tieta.

She (co-won with Zezé Motta on Night Angels) the award for best actress at the 1987 Gramado Film Festival for "Anjos do Arrabalde" (or "Angels of the Outskirts").

Selected filmography
 Bye Bye Brasil (1979)
 Subway to the Stars (1987)
 The Story of Fausta (1988)
 Tieta (1989)
 Perfume de Gardênia (1992)
 A Indomada (1997)
 Suave Veneno (1999)
 América (2005)
 Alma Gêmea (2005)
 Duas Caras (2007)
 Uma Rosa com Amor (2010)
 Avenida Brasil (2012)
 Casa da Mãe Joana 2 (2013)

References

External links

1941 births
Living people
Actresses from Rio de Janeiro (city)
Brazilian television actresses
Brazilian telenovela actresses